Thomas Seymour, 1st Baron Seymour of Sudeley, KG, PC (20 March 1549) was a brother of Jane Seymour, the third wife of King Henry VIII. With his brother, Edward Seymour, 1st Duke of Somerset and Lord Protector of England, he vied for control of their nephew, the young King Edward VI. In 1547 Seymour became the fourth husband of Catherine Parr, who had been the sixth and last wife and queen of Henry VIII. During his marriage to Parr, Seymour involved the future Queen Elizabeth I (then 14 years old), who resided in his household, in flirtatious and possibly sexual behaviour.

Family and royal connections
Thomas Seymour was the son of Sir John Seymour and Margaret Wentworth. He was the fourth of their six sons; his elder brother Edward (1500–1552) would become 1st Duke of Somerset. He grew up at Wulfhall, the Seymour family home in Wiltshire. The Seymours were a family of country gentry, who, like most holders of manorial rights, traced their ancestry to a Norman origin.

Henry VIII and his second wife, Anne Boleyn, did not have a son although Henry hoped for a male heir. His interests turned elsewhere, to Seymour's sister Jane, one of Anne's ladies in waiting. Henry married Jane eleven days after Anne's execution in May 1536, and the Seymour brothers saw their fortunes rise: in that year, Thomas became a gentleman of the privy chamber.

In October of the following year, Queen Jane gave birth to a son, Edward Tudor, who would become King Edward VI. Her two brothers, Edward and Thomas, were, therefore, uncles to the baby Edward, heir to the throne. Less than two weeks later, Jane died from complications related to childbirth.

Thomas Seymour's other royal connection was with Catherine Parr, Henry VIII's sixth wife, whom Seymour would later marry, after Henry's death. In 1543, Parr established herself as part of Princess Mary's household, where she caught the attention of the King. Although she had already begun a romantic relationship with Seymour, she saw it as her duty to accept Henry's proposal.

Foreign affairs
In 1538, Seymour was sent to the embassy at the French court. He was one of those appointed to meet Anne of Cleves, King Henry's fourth wife, at Calais on 13 December 1539. A few weeks later he was sent to King Ferdinand I of Hungary, brother of Emperor Charles V, to enlist support for Henry against France and Scotland. He arrived in Vienna in July, and remained there for two years. In May 1543, he was appointed ambassador to the Habsburg court in Brussels. He was given this posting to remove him from King Henry's court, in view of the King's marriage to Catherine Parr.

War breaking out between England and France, Seymour was made marshal of the English army in the Netherlands on 26 June 1543, being second in command to Sir John Wallop. On 24 July, with a strong detachment, he captured and destroyed the castles of Rinquecen and Arbrittayne near the French port of Boulogne. For a short time, he held the chief command during Wallop's illness. Due to his position of privilege as a royal uncle and as a reward for his services, Seymour was made Master-General of the Ordnance in 1544 and Lord Warden of the Cinque Ports in 1545, both senior military positions.

Regency Council and marriage to Catherine Parr

Seymour returned to court just before Henry VIII died in January 1547, leaving Catherine one of the wealthiest women in England. According to the King's will, a regency council was constituted to rule on behalf of the nine-year-old orphaned King Edward. Thomas Seymour became 1st Baron Seymour of Sudeley, and his older brother Edward became Duke of Somerset, and is often, therefore, referred to as "Somerset". In addition, Thomas Seymour saw his brother rise, amid the contentious and dangerous politics of the English Reformation, to the position of chief councillor with an approved title of "Protector" regent, referred to unofficially as Lord Protector of England, in effect, ruler of the realm as regent for his nephew, the king. Thomas began to resent his brother and the relationship between them began to dissolve. Although Thomas was named Lord High Admiral as a concession, he was consumed by jealousy of his brother's power and influence and worked to unseat and replace his brother as Lord Protector.

Thomas Seymour sought to overturn his brother's position on the regency council by his personal influence over the young king, and also possibly by making a royal marriage. Although his name had been linked to Mary Howard, Duchess of Richmond, he was still unmarried at the time of Henry VIII's death. He had previously shown some interest in marrying either of Henry's daughters, Elizabeth or Mary; however, within weeks of Henry's death, Thomas Seymour had rekindled the affair with Catherine Parr, and they were secretly married in April or May 1547, too soon after the king's death to suit many. Anne Stanhope, Somerset's proud wife, disliked Catherine and Thomas and began to turn many people in court against them.

Relationship with Elizabeth

Upon their marriage, Seymour moved into his wife's house, at Chelsea Manor in London, where she lived with her step-daughter, the 14-year-old Elizabeth. Seymour was the uncle of Elizabeth's half-brother, and the newly-wed husband of her stepmother. Now, living under the same roof as Elizabeth, Thomas Seymour began to show affection toward Elizabeth, tickling her, and slapping her on her behind as she lay in her bed, or coming into her room in his nightclothes. Her governess, Kat Ashley, thought this scandalous, and reported it to Catherine. Indignant, Seymour retorted, 'By God's precious soul, I mean no evil, and I will not leave it!'  At first, Catherine dismissed the behaviour as innocent fun, and even joined in the behaviour on a few occasions. Elizabeth's feelings regarding this behaviour are unknown, but it was said that she bore Thomas some degree of affection; and though her governess "bade him go away in shame," she found him more amusing than dangerous. When Catherine was pregnant in the spring of 1548, she had become concerned enough about her husband's flirtatious relationship with Elizabeth that she sent Elizabeth away to live with Anthony Denny and his wife, Joan Champernowne (Kat Ashley's sister), in Hertfordshire. 

In June 1548, Catherine and Thomas Seymour moved their household from London to Sudeley Castle in Gloucestershire, the property granted to Seymour when he became Baron Seymour of Sudeley. In September 1548, Catherine gave birth to a daughter, Mary Seymour. In the following days, she became uncharacteristically hostile and delusional. Thomas lay in bed with her to quiet her, but she did not get better, and died of childbirth complications, just before Elizabeth's 15th birthday. Upon her death, Catherine bequeathed all of her possessions to Thomas, making him one of the wealthiest men in England. He said he was "amazed" at her death; yet it opened up new opportunities for him, as his eye returned to Elizabeth. She avoided him, returning with her governess to her childhood home, Hatfield House in Hertfordshire.

Relationship with Edward VI

Despite his great wealth and high position, Thomas Seymour could not come to terms with his brother's appointment as protector; and in his struggle with Somerset, he tried to ingratiate himself with the king, who was merely a child. He sought the 9-year-old Edward to write a letter on his behalf in support of his marriage to the dowager queen, Catherine Parr. The letter was obviously dictated by Thomas for Edward's signature and only enraged Somerset. He began to visit Edward frequently, secretly giving him an extravagant allowance of coins, so that Edward might be satisfied in feeling more grown-up and more king-like, giving gifts to his servants, teachers, and friends. Even though he lived in sumptuous splendour and wanting for nothing, no provisions had been made for Edward's pocket money; he became accustomed to these regular payments and began to ask Seymour freely for his allowance.

Thomas continued his manipulation of the king. In trying to get a bill through Parliament making him Edward's personal governor, Seymour requested Edward's royal signature on the bill. But Edward was uncertain and reluctant to go behind the back of the protector, Somerset, and of the regency council, and he would not sign it. Seymour persistently pressured Edward, until Edward felt threatened. But Seymour did not give up. He tried to persuade Edward that he did not need a protector, getting Edward to admit that it might be better for Somerset to die. It is not known what the king meant by this, but it was probably uttered innocently. Seymour intended that the king's royal signature and personal support would destabilize Somerset's position as protector, and as a member of the regency council. In his frustration and inability to gain any significant influence over the king, Thomas Seymour began to think in terms of open rebellion.

Downfall
In the summer of 1547, Somerset invaded Scotland. During his absence from the court, his brother, Thomas, fomented opposition to his authority, voicing open disapproval of his brother's administrative skills. Because his activities seemed suspicious, several members of the nobility advised him to be content with his position, but he would not listen. As Lord High Admiral, he was able to control the English navy, and he openly asked for support in case of a rebellion. He entered into relations with pirates on the western coasts, whom it was his duty as Lord High Admiral to suppress, with a view to securing their support. Thomas seems also to have hoped to finance a rebellion through crooked dealings with the vice-treasurer of the Bristol Mint, Sir William Sharington.

By 1548, the regency council was becoming aware of Thomas's bid for power. Somerset tried to save his brother from ruin, calling a council meeting so that Thomas might explain himself. However, Thomas did not appear. On the night of 16 January 1549, for reasons that are not clear (perhaps to take the young king away in his own custody), Seymour was caught trying to break into the King's apartments at Hampton Court Palace. He entered the privy garden and woke one of the King's pet spaniels. In response to the dog's barking, he shot and killed it. The next day, he was arrested and sent to the Tower of London. The incident, being caught outside the king's bedroom, at night, with a loaded pistol, was interpreted in the most menacing light, even casting suspicion on Elizabeth's involvement with Thomas.  On 18 January, the council sent agents to question everyone associated with Thomas, including Elizabeth. On 22 February, the council officially accused him of thirty-three charges of treason. He was convicted of treason, condemned to death and executed on 20 March 1549. Catherine's brother William Parr, 1st Marquess of Northampton, inherited Sudeley castle.

Aftermath
When he was arrested for treason, Seymour's associates were also cast under suspicion, including 15-year-old Elizabeth. She did not realize her own danger until her servants, including her governess Kat Ashley, were also arrested. Upon realizing that Thomas would probably be executed, she was noticeably disconsolate, trying to free herself and her servants from suspicion. The regency council was sure of her complicity with Thomas, and sought to bully an easy confession from her. She was interrogated for weeks. But the council found itself in a sharply defined game of wits with Elizabeth, who proved to be a master of logic, defiance, and shrewdness. The embarrassing details of Seymour's flirtatious behaviour came to light but there was no evidence that Elizabeth had conspired with him.

After his execution, all of Seymour's property was seized by the Crown. His attainder was reversed by Parliament in 1550, although the property was not returned to Mary Seymour, his only child; she is believed to have died at about the age of two, soon afterwards.

To his contemporaries, he appeared forceful and reckless, and also attractive to women. Sir Nicholas Throckmorton, a boyhood friend of King Edward, described Thomas Seymour as "hardy, wise and liberal ... fierce in courage, courtly in fashion, in personage stately, in voice magnificent, but somewhat empty of matter".

In popular culture
In the 1953 film Young Bess (based on the novel of the same title by Margaret Irwin), Stewart Granger was cast as Seymour. The plot, largely a romance between him and Princess Elizabeth (played by 24-year-old Jean Simmons), had little historical accuracy.

In the 2007 Showtime television show The Tudors, Andrew McNair portrays Seymour. He appears in seasons three and four.

He is a character in the C. J. Sansom novel Revelation, featuring Sansom's fictional lawyer/detective Matthew Shardlake. He is portrayed as a hot-headed military man, with designs on Catherine Parr, in the months before the latter's marriage to Henry VIII. He reappears as a secondary character in the next two novels in the series, Heartstone and Lamentation.

Norah Lofts, in her biography of Walter Raleigh Here Was a Man, suggests that Elizabeth was attracted to Raleigh because he reminded her of Seymour.

In the Starz 2022 series Becoming Elizabeth, Tom Cullen plays Seymour.

Notes

References

 
 
 
 
 
 
 
 
 
 

Attribution

Further reading
 Bernard, G. W. "The Downfall of Thomas Seymour." in The Tudor Nobility, ed. G.W. Bernard (Manchester University Press, 1992): 217–28.

External links

 
 Sir Thomas Seymour, Lord Seymour of Sudeley  Family tree
 
 

Thomas
16th-century English nobility
16th-century English politicians
16th-century Royal Navy personnel
1500s births
1549 deaths
Year of birth uncertain
Barons in the Peerage of England
Peers of England created by Edward VI
English MPs 1545–1547
Knights of the Garter
Lord High Admirals of England
Lords Warden of the Cinque Ports
Executed military leaders
People convicted under a bill of attainder
Executions at the Tower of London
People executed by Tudor England by decapitation
People executed for treason against England
People executed under Edward VI of England
Executed people from Gloucestershire
People from Winchcombe
English politicians convicted of crimes
Child sexual abuse in England
Husbands of Catherine Parr